Events from the year 1479 in France

Incumbents
 Monarch – Louis XI

Events
 7 August – A French army is defeated at the Battle of Guinegate

Births
 Unknown – Claude Chevallon, printer (died 1537)

References

1470s in France